The 2011 Sucrogen Townsville 400 was a motor race for the Australian sedan-based V8 Supercars racing cars. It was the seventh event of the 2011 International V8 Supercars Championship. It was held on the weekend of July 8 to 10 at the Townsville Street Circuit in Townsville, Queensland. It was the third running of the Townsville 400.

The event hosted races 14 and 15 of the 2011 season. A 72 lap, 200-kilometre race was held on both Saturday and Sunday. Qualifying for Race 14 consisted of a 20-minute, all-in session with the fastest ten progressing to the top ten shootout. Qualifying for Race 15 was a single 20 minute, all-in session.

Mark Winterbottom used the number 95 for this event in a promotion for the Pixar movie Cars 2, in which he starred. Winterbottom became the first driver to score four straight series poles since Mark Skaife in 1998 when he took pole for Race 14. The Holden Racing Team's Garth Tander won Race 14 from Jamie Whincup and Winterbottom's team mate Will Davison. Winterbottom finished fifth behind Craig Lowndes. There was controversy over Tander's win when he escaped a drive-through penalty despite hitting the bollard and appearing to cross the blend line at pit entry.  Kelly Racing driver Greg Murphy was later given a penalty for a similar incident at the pit exit. Murphy's team mate David Reynolds led the race early on in an impressive drive but collided with James Courtney on his way into pit lane. The incident put Courtney out of the race and significantly damaged Reynolds car, leaving him 24th at race's end, ten laps off the lead.

Lowndes claimed pole position for Race 15 from Winterbottom and Reynolds. Lowndes led for most of the race before team mate Whincup, who had to queue behind Lowndes in his second pit stop, passed him in the closing stages. Winterbottom completed the podium. The two Stone Brothers Racing drivers, Alex Davison and Shane van Gisbergen, finished fourth and fifth respectively. Saturday winner Tander was in contention until a rear suspension failure dropped him several laps off the lead. Reynolds again had a disappointing race after a strong qualifying performance.

The weekend saw Whincup extend his lead over Lowndes in the championship from 156 to 186 points, the two Triple Eight drivers beginning to pull away from third placed Van Gisbergen. Whincup scored 288 points to Lowndes' 258, while Winterbottom had the third highest total for the event with 240.

Results
Results as follows:

Qualifying Race 14
Qualifying timesheet:

Race 14
Race timesheets:

Qualifying Race 15
Qualifying timesheet:

Race 15
Race timesheets:

Standings
 After 15 of 28 races.

References

Sucrogen Townsville 400